The DRDO Fluffy was a target drone designed and developed by the Defence Research and Development Organisation's Aeronautical Development Establishment (ADE) in Bangalore in early 1970s for use by the Indian Armed Forces.

It had a maximum endurance of 5 minutes and could be launched from the maximum altitude of 30,000 feet. After the development of the reusable Aerial Target DRDO Lakshya, which was simpler and more economical to use than Fluffy, the production of the latter was discontinued.

See also
DRDO Lakshya
List of unmanned aerial vehicles

Unmanned military aircraft of India
Military equipment of India
Fluffy